The 2018  eruption was a series of volcanic explosions and pyroclastic flows from the  (Spanish for Volcano of Fire) in  on Sunday 3 June 2018. The eruption included lahars, pyroclastic flows, and clouds of volcanic ash, which left almost no evacuation time at all and caused the death of officially nearly 200 people. It was the deadliest eruption in Guatemala since 1929.

Background
It is a stratovolcano that has had more than 60 eruptions since 1524, including a major eruption in 1974 which produced pyroclastic flows that destroyed the region's winter harvest and ashfall that covered nearby cities. The 3 June eruption is one of the deadliest in the country, including the Santa María eruption of 1902 and the  dome collapse of 1929, which killed hundreds. The most eruptive phase began in 2002 and produced an explosive eruption in 2012 that forced 33,000 people to evacuate, but had no reported deaths. 

The population around the volcano is estimated to be 54,000 within  and more than 1 million within .

Eruption
On Sunday 3 June 2018, at around noon local time,  in southern  began a volcanic eruption which left almost no evacuation time. The heat and explosive impact of the volcano brought about rocks the size of baseballs and larger strewn about, and car tires melted into the ground. The eruption prompted the evacuation of about 3,100 people from nearby areas. Ashfall forced the shutdown of La Aurora International Airport, the country's primary airport, where members of the Guatemalan military were deployed to remove ash off the runway; some flights were canceled, but the airport was able to reopen on 4 June.

Pyroclastic flows—fast-moving clouds of hot gas and volcanic matter—caused many of the casualties and crop damage. , 's national institute of volcanology, warned on 4 June that further pyroclastic flows and lahars (volcanic mudflows) were possible. Heavy rainfall during the eruption led to the formation of dangerous lahars. Volcanic material buried several of the affected villages and cut off roadways. The poor weather and unpredictable lahars complicated the recovery operation, and all rescue efforts had to be suspended overnight on 3 June. The volcanic material also destroyed an estimated  of corn, bean, and coffee crops.

Continued June eruptions 
On 5 June, a second eruption occurred and prompted additional evacuations. On 8 June, new volcanic flows prompted more evacuations of rescue workers and residents of the town of El Rodeo, who had recently returned to their homes and were told to leave once again. On 9 June, additional lahars prompted preventive evacuations in Santa Lucía Cotzumalguapa. Around 69 people died from the eruption, and air travel was postponed because of the ash cloud.

November eruption 

On 18 November 2018, Volcán de Fuego entered a new eruptive and violent phase that prompted preventive evacuations of approximately 4,000 people from communities near the volcano. CONRED issued a red alert in the area that closed main roads and suspended flights at the La Aurora International Airport.

Victims
At least 190 people were killed, 57 injured, and 256 remained missing as of 30 July 2018—including a number of children, a CONRED officer, firefighters, and a policeman—although local residents estimate that approximately 2,000 people are buried and a local organization said that up to 2,900 may have died. Due to the intense heat and burn injuries, many bodies were planned to be identified with anthropological methods and DNA. As of 18 June 2018, up to 159 cases entered the morgues, with 85 of the victims having been identified.

Animals 
Animals such as dogs, cats, chickens, monkeys, donkeys and other species were found by rescuers with burns or blinded by the eruption. In many cases urgent veterinary care was required to treat eye infections, respiratory problems, and burns caused by dust, hot ash and gas from the eruption. In one heartbreaking instance, a dog led rescuers towards its destroyed owners' home, where his owner, and the rest of people in the house, had been killed.

Response
Former President Jimmy Morales ordered three days of national mourning in response to the disaster and visited some of the affected towns and villages in person on 4 June.
Messages of support, solidarity, and offers of assistance were given by various world leaders. 

The  (CONRED), Guatemala's disaster relief agency, reported that more than 1.7 million people have been affected by the eruption and its ashfall. A state of emergency was declared in the departments of Escuintla, Chimaltenango, and Sacatepéquez.

Organizations such as GoFundMe, and The National Federation of Cooperatives are being used to raise physical and monetary donations to be dispersed to those affected by the eruption. GoFundMe created a centralized hub for all verified campaigns that are providing aid to those affected.

Severely wounded individuals are scheduled to receive medical attention in the United States and Mexico, and an emergency medical team from Shriners Hospitals for Children would travel from the United States.

Recovery
The Guatemalan Mountain Rescue Brigade were already searching for a missing person when they suddenly realized that the volcano's activity had increased. Firefighters have been deployed in order to help evacuate residents and recover bodies. Family members who grew tired of waiting for organized efforts by the government organized their own groups of recovery operations and defied police roadblocks to dig at the debris.

A member of a firefighter support organization stated, "Basically there's no houses left, and to my assumption there's nobody left there... except the people doing the search and rescue." A volunteer firefighter added that the ground was very unstable and that breathing was difficult and firefighters' boot soles had been torn off because of the heat.

Firefighters have stated that after 72 hours the chance of finding anyone alive would be nonexistent.

Controversy 
On 7 June, opposition politician Mario Taracena, in an address to Congress, accused the executive secretary of the National Coordination for Disaster Reduction (CONRED) of mismanaging the disaster warnings. The director of the National Institute for Seismology, Vulcanology, Meteorology and Hydrology also came under criticism for mismanagement and lack of warnings, a claim they  refuted. Taracena also called for a government investigation into potential criminal negligence.  A lawmaker told reporters that seismologists warned of the eruption eight hours before the main eruption, however, three hours later the national disaster agency CONRED called for voluntary evacuations only. Mandatory evacuations were ordered at 3pm local time, after some communities were already covered by volcanic flow.

See also
List of large volcanic eruptions in the 21st century
List of large volcanic eruptions of the 20th century
List of volcanic eruptions by death toll

References

2018 in Guatemala
2018 natural disasters
Fuego eruption
Natural disasters in Guatemala
June 2018 events in North America
Fuego